This is a demography of the population of Andorra, including population density, ethnicity, education level, health of the populace, economic status, religious affiliations and other aspects of the population.

Andorrans, who are ethnically Catalans, are a minority in their own country; Spanish, French, and Portuguese residents make up 67.7% of the population.

The national language is Catalan, a Romance language in the Western Romance group. It is spoken by more than 12 million people in the nearer territories. Spanish, French, and Portuguese also are spoken.

Andorrans live in seven urbanized valleys that form Andorra's political districts the seven parròquies (parishes):
Andorra la Vella
Canillo
Encamp
Escaldes-Engordany
La Massana
Ordino
Sant Julià de Lòria

Vital statistics
From state sources:

CIA World Factbook demographic statistics 

The following demographic statistics are from the CIA World Factbook, unless otherwise indicated.

Population
85,645 (July 2021 est.)
country comparison to the world: 199

Age structure
0-14 years: 13.37% (male 5,901/female 5,551)
15-24 years: 10.16% (male 4,474/female 4,227)
25-54 years: 43.19% (male 18,857/female 18,131)
55-64 years: 15.91% (male 7,184/female 6,443)
65 years and over: 17.36% (male 7,544/female 7,323) (2020 est.)

Median age
Total: 46.2 years
Male: 46.3 years
Female: 46.1 years (2020 est.)

Urbanization
Urban population: 87.9% of total population (2021)
Rate of urbanization: 0.11% annual rate of change (2020-25 est.)

Sex ratio
At birth: 1.07 male(s)/female
Under 15 years: 1.06 male(s)/female
15-24 years: 1.06 male(s)/female
25-54 years: 1.04 male(s)/female
55-64 years: 1.12 male(s)/female
65 years and over: 1.03 male(s)/female
Total population: 1.06 male(s)/female (2020 est.)

Infant mortality rate
Total: 3.5 deaths/1,000 live births
country comparison to the world: 198
Male: 3.59 deaths/1,000 live births
Female: 3.4 deaths/1,000 live births (2021 est.)

Life expectancy at birth
Total population: 83.23 years
Country comparison to the world: 9
Male: 80.99 years
Female: 85.6 years (2021 est.)

Total fertility rate
1.44 children born/woman (2021 est.)
country comparison to the world: 212

Nationality

Noun: Andorran(s)
Adjective: Andorran

Ethnic groups
Andorrans 48.7% (2020 est.)
Spanish 24.6% (who are divided into Spanish and Catalan speakers)
Portuguese 11.6%
French 4.4%
 Other 10.6% (including Britons and Italians)
 (These figures correspond to ethnicity and not mother tongue or citizenship.)

Religions

Languages 

Catalan (official), Spanish (Castilian), French, Portuguese

Literacy
Definition: age 15 and over can read and write
Total population: 100%
Male: 100%
Female: 100% (2016)

School life expectancy (primary to tertiary education)
Total: 11 years (2006)

Education expenditure
3.2% of GDP (2019)
country comparison to the world: 124

References 

 
Geography of Andorra
Society of Andorra